The Elder Scrolls Travels is a series of portable role-playing video games in The Elder Scrolls series, primarily developed and published by Vir2L Studios. The series consists of Stormhold (2003), Dawnstar (2004), Shadowkey (2004), Oblivion Mobile (2006) and the cancelled Oblivion (PSP).

Stormhold 

The Elder Scrolls Travels: Stormhold is a role-playing video game developed for J2ME and BREW devices, in the style of the games from the main The Elder Scrolls series. Like the other two titles in The Elder Scrolls Travels series, it was developed and published by Vir2L Studios. The game was released on August 1, 2003.

Dawnstar 

The Elder Scrolls Travels: Dawnstar is a role-playing video game developed for J2ME and BREW devices, in the style of the games from the main The Elder Scrolls series. Like the other two titles in The Elder Scrolls Travels series, it was developed and published by Vir2L Studios. The game was released on August 26, 2004.

Shadowkey

Oblivion 

The Elder Scrolls Travels: Oblivion is a role-playing video game developed for the PlayStation Portable, in the style of the games from the main The Elder Scrolls series. It was never released. Five Beta builds can be found online.

Oblivion Mobile 

Oblivion Mobile (officially The Elder Scrolls Travels: Oblivion) is an Elder Scrolls Travels game available on Java-enabled cell phones. It is one of the four mobile games in that series. It follows the storyline established in the console and PC versions of Oblivion, but previous experience with these versions is not required to enjoy the game.

Gameplay 
Gameplay is handled with the numeric touchpad as well as the normal game action keys.
Oblivion Mobile includes ten main levels and four optional quests. Eight classes are available to choose from, and each has access to different armor, weapons, and spells, as well as a number of items available to them all. The mobile version played from an isometric perspective while mostly retaining the same gameplay as its console and computer counterparts.

References 

The Elder Scrolls
Role-playing video games
2003 video games
2004 video games
Mobile games
N-Gage games
Java platform games
Bethesda Softworks games
Video games featuring protagonists of selectable gender
Video games developed in the United States